Smokin' Armadillos is the self-titled album of the American country music band Smokin' Armadillos. It was released in 1996 via MCG/Curb Records.

Content
The album includes the singles "Let Your Heart Lead Your Mind" and "Thump Factor", which both entered the Hot Country Songs charts in 1996. "My Girlfriend Might" and "I'm a Cowboy" were previously included on the band's 1993 EP Out of the Burrow.

Critical reception
Dan Kuchar of Country Standard Time gave a mixed review, saying that the band's "publicists seem to want to portray them as a country-fied New Kids on the Block". He praised the variety of stylistic influences and musicianship, but thought that the band had "yet to establish a sonic trademark for themselves". Jack Leaver of Allmusic rated it 3 stars out of 5, saying that the band "plays with an unbridled enthusiasm that serves the material well."

Track listing
"Too Hot to Handle" (Steve Meeks) — 2:56
"The Big Bad Beat (Of My Broken Heart)" (Al Carmichael, Gary Griffin) — 2:49
"Miracle Man" (Al, Bird, Greg Barnhill) — 4:12
"Thump Factor" (Tony Martin, Scott Meeks) — 2:45
"Love of a Lifetime" (Scott Meeks) — 3:37
"When Will I Ever Learn" (Scott Meeks) — 3:48
"Let Your Heart Lead Your Mind" (Scott Meeks, Jason Theiste) — 3:30
"The Legend of Wooley Swamp" (Charlie Daniels, Tom Crain, Joel DiGregorio, Fred Edwards, James W. Marshall, Charlie Hayward) — 4:24
feat. Charlie Daniels
"Dance with a Brand New Partner" (Aaron Casida) — 3:33
"Could I Have Made It Back Then" (Cassida, Scott Meeks, Rick Russell) — 4:16
"I'm a Cowboy" (Josh Graham, B.J. Welle) — 4:22
"My Girlfriend Might" (Graham) — 4:36

Personnel
Compiled from liner notes.

Musicians
Smokin' Armadillos
 Aaron Casida — bass guitar
 Josh Graham — rhythm guitar
 Darrin Kirkindoll — drums
 Scott Meeks — lead guitar, acoustic guitar
 Rick Russell — lead vocals
 Jason Theiste — fiddle

Additional musicians
Eddie Bayers — drums
Michael Black — background vocals
Birch Caffee — piano, keyboards
John Catchings — cello
J. T. Corenflos — acoustic guitar
Conni Ellisor — violin
Larry Franklin — fiddle
Rob Hajacos — fiddle
Tony Harrell — piano, keyboards
Mary Ann Kennedy — background vocals
Brent Mason — electric guitar
Terry McMillan — harmonica, percussion
Steve Nathan — piano, keyboards
Louis "Big Bad Beat" Nunley — background vocals
Michael Rhodes — bass guitar
Brent Rowan — electric guitar
John Wesley Ryles — background vocals
Kelly Shiver — background vocals
Hank Singer — fiddle
Michael Spriggs — acoustic guitar
Neil Thrasher — background vocals
 John Willis — electric guitar
Glenn Worf — bass guitar

Production
All tracks produced by Chuck Howard. "I'm a Cowboy" co-produced by Chris Farren and Smokin' Armadillos; adapted from original dance mix by Chris Farren.

Tracks 1, 5, 6, 7, 9-12 arranged by Smokin' Armadillos; additional arrangement on tracks 5, 7, 9, 10 by Birch Caffee.

Chart performance

Album

Singles

References

1996 albums
Smokin' Armadillos albums
Curb Records albums